Chance Perdomo is an American-born English actor. He appeared in Killed by My Debt (2018) and played Ambrose Spellman on the Netflix series Chilling Adventures of Sabrina.

Early life and education
Perdomo was born in Los Angeles, California and moved to Southampton in the county of Hampshire, England with his mother as a child. He holds both British and American citizenship. He attended Redbridge Community School in Southampton before going to Peter Symonds College in Winchester, where he was elected president of the sixth form's student union.
 He intended to study Law after graduating but decided to pursue acting instead, moving, with money he made working in a shoe shop and at a cinema, to London where he joined the National Youth Theatre and trained at Identity School of Acting.

Career
In February 2018, it was announced that Perdomo was cast in the series regular role of Ambrose Spellman on the Netflix series Chilling Adventures of Sabrina. Reports revealed that Perdomo previously auditioned for the role of Jughead Jones on Riverdale, but the role was given to Cole Sprouse. Perdomo, however, impressed Roberto Aguirre-Sacasa, the creator of the series, with his audition so much so, that Aquirre-Sacasa wrote the role of Sabrina's Ambrose with the actor in mind.

Filmography

Film

Television

Radio

References

External links

Living people
21st-century English male actors
Actors from Los Angeles
Black British male actors
British male film actors
British male television actors
English people of Guyanese descent
English people of African-American descent
American people of Guyanese descent
Male actors from Southampton
National Youth Theatre members
People educated at Peter Symonds College
21st-century British male actors
1996 births
American emigrants to England